George Franklin Grant (September 15, 1846 – August 21, 1910) was the first African-American professor at Harvard. He was also a Boston dentist, and an inventor of an early composite golf tee made from wood and natural rubber (specifically, gutta-percha) tubing.

Biography
Grant was born on September 15, 1846, in Oswego, New York, to Phillis Pitt and Tudor Elandor Grant. He attended the Bordentown School in Bordentown, New Jersey.

He entered the Harvard School of Dental cosmetics in 1868, and graduated in 1870. He then took a position in the department of mechanical dentistry in 1871, making him Harvard University's first African-American faculty member.

Grant was a founding member and later the president of the Harvard Odontological Society and was a member of the Harvard Dental Alumni Association where he was elected president in 1881. In 1899 he improved on Percy Ellis' "Perfectum" tee.

Grant died on August 21, 1910, at his vacation home in Chester, New Hampshire, of liver disease.

Patent

See also
 William Lowell Sr., another golf tee inventor

References

Harvard University faculty
Golf equipment manufacturers
1846 births
1910 deaths
African-American educators
Bordentown School alumni
Harvard School of Dental Medicine alumni
20th-century African-American people